Cell division cycle 5-like protein is a protein that in humans is encoded by the CDC5L gene.

Function 

The protein encoded by this gene shares a significant similarity with Schizosaccharomyces pombe cdc5 gene product, which is a cell cycle regulator important for G2/M transition. This protein has been demonstrated to act as a positive regulator of cell cycle G2/M progression. It was also found to be an essential component of a non-snRNA spliceosome, which contains at least five additional protein factors and is required for the second catalytic step of pre-mRNA splicing.

Interactions 

CDC5L has been shown to interact with:

 ASF/SF2, 
 BZW1, 
 CWC15, 
 DNA-PKcs, 
 DYNC1H1, 
 GCN1L1, 
 HSPA8, 
 ILF2, 
 PLRG1, 
 PPM1D, 
 PPP1CA, 
 PRPF19, 
 RBMX and 
 RPL12,
 RPL13, 
 RPS16, 
 RPS25, 
 SF3A1, 
 SF3B1, 
 SF3B2, 
 SF3B4, 
 SFPQ, 
 SFRS2, 
 SNRPA1, 
 SNRPD3, 
 SRRM1, 
 Small nuclear ribonucleoprotein D1, 
 Small nuclear ribonucleoprotein D2, 
 Small nuclear ribonucleoprotein polypeptide A, 
 TOP2A,  and
 TTF2.

See also
G2/M checkpoint

References

Further reading

External links